Jakob Liiv (28 February 1859 Alatskivi Parish, Tartu County – 17 January 1938 Rakvere) was an Estonian writer and playwright.

His younger brother was writer Juhan Liiv.

After 1897 he was a teacher at Triigi-Avispea School in Väike-Maarja Parish. Because he was a notable public figure, around him writers were gathered (so-called Parnassus of Väike-Maarja). In 1913 he moved to Rakvere where he worked as a bank clerk and at the same time being an editor for local newspaper.

From 1919 to 1921 he was the mayor of Rakvere.

He was a member of Estonian Labour Party.

Selected works
 1886: poetry collection "Viru kannel" ('Viru lyre')
 1898: poetry collection "Kõrbelõvi" ('Desert Lion')
 play "Kolmat aega vallavanem" ('Third-Term Parish Elder')
 1938: collection of short stories "Mälestusi lühijuttudes" ('Memories in Short Stories')

References

1859 births
1938 deaths
Estonian male poets
Estonian dramatists and playwrights
Estonian male short story writers
19th-century Estonian writers
20th-century Estonian writers
Estonian schoolteachers
Mayors of places in Estonia
People from Peipsiääre Parish